Life of a Craphead is an art duo consisting of Jon McCurley and Amy Lam, based in Toronto, Ontario, Canada.  They have presented work at The Power Plant, Gallery TPW, Hotel MariaKapel, Department of Safety, and the Banff Centre. Their work combines art and humour.

McCurley and Lam created Life of a Craphead in 2006. Their first joint performances were in comedy clubs in 2006.  Later they began creating interactive art installations in Toronto public spaces.

Life of a Craphead was the Art Gallery of Ontario's Artist-in-Residence from January to March 2013.   In April they organized and curated an artistic lecture and performance event entitled Trampoline Hall at the Garrison hall in Toronto.

Every Sunday from October 29 until November 29, 2017, Life of a Craphead performed King Edward VII Equestrian Statue Floating Down the Don, floating a replica of an equestrian sculpture of King Edward VII down the Don River. The original 15-foot bronze sculpture was erected in India in 1922 to commemorate the Edward VII's reign as emperor. Toronto businessman Harry Jackman paid to have the bronze figure moved to Toronto from India, where it had been placed in storage after the India became independent  in 1947. It was installed in Queens Park in 1969.

References 

Canadian artist groups and collectives
Artists from Toronto
Canadian comedy troupes
Canadian comedy duos